Galaalu is a town in coastal Eritrea. It is located in the Northern Red Sea region, and is the capital of the Ghela'elo district.

References
Statoids.com, retrieved December 8, 2010

Populated places in Eritrea
Northern Red Sea Region